List of hospitals in Maine (U.S. state), sorted by location.

Augusta, Kennebec County
Riverview Psychiatric Center (formerly Augusta Mental Health Institute)
MaineGeneral Medical Center - Alfond Center for Health
Bangor, Penobscot County
Dorothea Dix Psychiatric Center (formerly Bangor Mental Health Institute)
Northern Light Eastern Maine Medical Center
St. Joseph Hospital
Northern Light Acadia Hospital
Bar Harbor, Hancock County
Mount Desert Island Hospital
Belfast, Waldo County
Waldo County General Hospital
Biddeford, York County
Southern Maine Health Care (formerly Southern Maine Medical Center)
Blue Hill, Hancock County
Northern Light Blue Hill Hospital
Bridgton, Cumberland County
Bridgton Hospital (Formerly Northern Cumberland Memorial Hospital)
Brunswick, Cumberland County
Mid Coast Hospital
Calais, Washington County
Calais Regional Hospital
Caribou, Aroostook County
Cary Medical Center
Damariscotta, Lincoln County
LincolnHealth - Miles Campus
Dover-Foxcroft, Piscataquis County
Northern Light Mayo Hospital
Ellsworth, Hancock County
Northern Light Maine Coast Hospital
Farmington, Franklin County
Franklin Memorial Hospital
Fort Kent, Aroostook County
Northern Maine Medical Center
Greenville, Piscataquis County
Northern Light C.A. Dean Hospital
Houlton, Aroostook County
Houlton Regional Hospital
Lewiston, Androscoggin County
Central Maine Medical Center
St. Mary's Regional Medical Center
Lincoln, Penobscot County
Penobscot Valley Hospital
Machias, Washington County
Down East Community Hospital
Millinocket, Penobscot County
Millinocket Regional Hospital
Norway, Oxford County
Stephens Memorial Hospital
Pittsfield, Somerset County
Northern Light Sebasticook Valley Hospital
Portland, Cumberland County
Maine Medical Center
Northern Light Mercy Hospital
Presque Isle, Aroostook County
Northern Light A.R. Gould Hospital  (Formerly The Aroostook Medical Center or TAMC)
Rockport, Knox County
Penobscot Bay Medical Center
Rumford, Oxford County
Rumford Community Hospital
Sanford, York County
Southern Maine Health Care
Skowhegan, Somerset County
Redington-Fairview General Hospital
Waterville, Kennebec County
Northern Light Inland Hospital
MaineGeneral Medical Center - Thayer Center for Health
Westbrook, Cumberland County
Spring Harbor Hospital
York, York County
York Hospital

References

Maine
 
Hospitals